The Japanese wagtail (Motacilla grandis) is a species of bird in the pipit and wagtail family Motacillidae. It is native to Japan and Korea.

Description
The Japanese wagtail is about 20 cm long. The sexes look similar; they have white underparts and black upperparts, throats, and backs. Their supercilia are also white. They have  black beaks and dark grey legs and feet. The plumage of a juvenile is greyer than that of an adult.

Taxonomy and systematics
The bird's Latin species name, grandis, means large.

Conservation
The Japanese wagtail is classed as a species of least concern by the IUCN. It has a stable population.

Behavior

Diet
The Japanese wagtail eats insects.

Roosting
Large groups of Japanese wagtails roost together in trees.

Breeding
Nests are built in cavities near water. The parents both look after the eggs and chicks. Four to six eggs are laid in each clutch.

Distribution
It is native to Japan and Korea. Vagrant birds have been recorded in Taiwan, eastern China and far-eastern Russia. It lives in inland wetlands, on arable land and in urban areas.

References

Japanese wagtail
Birds of Japan
Birds of Korea
Japanese wagtail
Taxonomy articles created by Polbot